Bantamweight is a weight class in combat sports.

The name for the class is derived from bantam chickens. Brazilian jiu-jitsu has an equivalent Rooster weight.

Boxing
Bantamweight is a class in boxing for boxers who weigh above 115 pounds (52.2 kg) and up to 118 pounds (53.5 kg).

Professional

History
The first title fight with gloves was between Chappie Moran and Ray Lewis in 1889. At that time, the limit for this weight class was 110 pounds. In 1910, however, the British settled on a limit of 118.

Current world champions

Current The Ring world rankings

As of February 25, 2023.

Keys:
 Current The Ring world champion

Longest reigning world bantamweight champions
Below is a list of longest reigning bantamweight champions in boxing measured by the individual's longest reign. Career total time as champion (for multiple time champions) does not apply.

 Active Title Reign
 Reign has ended

Amateur

Only one boxer has ever held the Olympic and World Amateur bantamweight titles simultaneously, Guillermo Rigondeaux of Cuba, who managed the feat twice in 2001 and 2005.

Olympic Champions

1904: 
1908: 
1920: 
1924: 
1928: 
1932: 
1936: 
1948: 
1952: 
1956: 
1960: 
1964: 
1968: 
1972: 
1976: 
1980: 
1984: 
1988: 
1992: 
1996: 
2000: 
2004: 
2008: 
2012: 
2016:

World Champions

 1974:  Wilfredo Gómez (PUR)
 1978:  Adolfo Horta (CUB)
 1982:  Floyd Favors (USA)
 1986:  Sung-Kil Moon (KOR)
 1989:  Enrique Carrión (CUB)
 1991: Serafim Todorov (BUL)
 1993:  Aleksandar Khristov (BUL)
 1995:  Raimkul Malakhbekov (RUS)
 1997:  Raimkul Malakhbekov (RUS)
 1999:  George Olteanu (ROU)
 2001:  Guillermo Rigondeaux (CUB)
 2003:  Aghasi Mammadov (AZE)
 2005:  Guillermo Rigondeaux (CUB)
 2007:  Sergey Vodopyanov (RUS)
 2009:  Detelin Dalakliev (BUL)
 2011:  Lázaro Álvarez (CUB)
 2013:  Javid Chalabiyev (AZE)
 2015:  Michael Conlan (IRL)
 2017:  Kairat Yeraliyev (KAZ)
 2021:  Tomoya Tsuboi (JPN)

Pan American Champions

1951:  Ricardo Gonzales (ARG)
1955:  Salvador Enriquez (VEN)
1959:  Waldo Claudiano (BRA)
1963:  Abel Almaraz (ARG)
1967:  Juvencio Martínez (MEX)
1971:  Pedro Flores (MEX)
1975:  Orlando Martínez (CUB)
1979:  Jackie Beard (USA)
1983:  Manuel Vilchez (VEN)
1987:  Manuel Martínez (CUB)
1991:  Enrique Carrion (CUB)
1995:  Juan Despaigne (CUB)
1999:  Gerald Tucker (USA)
2003:  Daniel Chyutin (CUB)
2007:  Carlos Cuadras (MEX)
2011:  Lázaro Álvarez (CUB)

European Champions

 1924:		Jean Ces
 1925:		Archie Rule
 1927:		Kurt Dalchow
 1928:		Vittorio Tamagnini
 1930:		János Széles
 1932:		Hans Ziglarski
 1934:		István Enekes
 1937:		Ulderico Sergo
 1939:		Ulderico Sergo
 1942:		Arturo Paoletti
 1947:		László Bogacs
 1949:		Giovanni Zuddas
 1951:		Vincenzo dall'Osso
 1953:		Zenon Stefaniuk
 1955:		Zenon Stefaniuk
 1957:		Oleg Grigoryev
 1959:		Horst Rascher
 1961:		Sergey Sivko
 1963:		Oleg Grigoryev
 1965:		Oleg Grigoryev
 1967:		Nicolae Gîju
 1969:		Aurel Dumitrescu
 1971:		Tibor Badari
 1973:		Aldo Cosentino
 1975:		Viktor Rybakov
 1977:		Stefan Förster
 1979:		Nikolay Chrapzov
 1981:		Viktor Miroshnichenko
 1983:		Yuri Alexandrov
 1985:		Ljubiša Simić
 1987:		Aleksandar Khristov
 1989:		Serafim Todorov
 1991:		Serafim Todorov
 1993:		Raimkul Malakhbekov
 1996:		István Kovács
 1998:		Serhiy Danylchenko
 2000:		Agasi Agaguloglu
 2002:		Khavazhi Khatsigov
 2004:		Gennady Kovalev
 2006:		Ali Aliyev
 2008:		Luke Campbell
 2010:		Eduard Abzalimov
 2011:		Veaceslav Gojan
 2013:		John Joe Nevin
 2015:		Michael Conlan
 2017:		Peter McGrail
 2019:		Kurt Walker
 2022:

Kickboxing
In kickboxing, a bantamweight fighter generally weighs between 53 kg (116 lb) and 55 kg (120 lb). However, some governing bodies have slightly different classes. For example, the International Kickboxing Federation (IKF) Bantamweight division (professional and amateur) is 117.1 lbs.–122 lbs. or 53.22 kg–55.45 kg.

Bare-knuckle boxing 
The bantamweight division limit generally differs among bare-knuckle boxing promotions:

Lethwei
In International Lethwei Federation Japan, Yuta Hamamoto is the Bantamweight Champion.

In World Lethwei Championship, Souris Manfredi is the Bantamweight Champion.

Mixed Martial Arts

In MMA, bantamweight is 126–135 pounds (57.2–61.2 kg).

Current champions
These tables were last updated in February 2023.

Muay Thai
In Muay Thai, bantamweight is 115–118 pounds (52.2-53.5 kg). A notable Muai Thai bantamweight fighter is Randy Thong Phoun Phim.

Wrestling
Wrestling also has similar weight classes including bantamweight.

See also
Reigning boxing champions

References

External links

Boxing weight classes
Kickboxing weight classes
Wrestling weight classes

sv:Viktklass